Frederick County Public Schools is a public school system run for the residents of Frederick County, Virginia.

High schools
James Wood High School, Winchester
Millbrook High School, Winchester
Sherando High School, Stephens City
Mountain Vista Governor's School also serves the county and students may apply to take courses via an application process and selection.

Middle schools
Admiral Richard E. Byrd, Winchester
Frederick County Middle School, Winchester
James Wood Middle School, Winchester
Robert E. Aylor Middle School, White Post (formerly located in Stephens City)

Elementary schools
Apple Pie Ridge, Winchester
Armel, Winchester
Bass-Hoover, Stephens City
Evendale, Winchester
Gainesboro, Gainesboro
Greenwood Mill, Winchester
Indian Hollow, Winchester
Middletown, Middletown
Orchard View, Winchester
Redbud Run, Winchester
Stonewall, Clear Brook

Other
Dowell J Howard Center, Winchester
Northwestern Regional Education Programs, Winchester
Parent Resource Center, Winchester
Northern Shenandoah Valley Adult Education, Winchester
Senseny Road School, Winchester

See also
Winchester Public Schools

External links
Official website

School divisions in Virginia
Education in Frederick County, Virginia